A 502-delegate loya jirga convened in Kabul, Afghanistan, on December 14, 2003, to consider the proposed Afghan Constitution. Originally planned to last ten days, the assembly did not endorse the charter until January 4, 2004. As has been generally the case with these assemblies, the endorsement came by way of consensus rather than a vote. Afghanistan's last constitution was drafted for the Democratic Republic of Afghanistan in November 1987.

Drafting the Constitution 
The Bonn Agreement of December 2001 required Afghanistan to draft and adopt a new constitution within two years. In October 2002, Interim President Hamid Karzai appointed a nine-member Constitutional Drafting Commission, chaired by Vice-President Nematullah Shahrani. Over the next six months, this body drafted a new constitution, based largely on the 1964 Afghan constitution. The initial draft, written primarily by Abdul Salam Azimi (who would become Chief Justice of Afghanistan's Supreme Court in 2006) was not the subject of in-depth political consultation. In April 2003, Interim President Karzai passed a decree appointing a new 35-member Constitutional Commission and laying out a public consultation process. This commission travelled widely throughout the country and reworked the draft, which was not released to the public until November 2003, only weeks before the Constitutional Convention (Loya Jirga) was scheduled to begin. This process was supported by several international institutions that provided funding, mostly through the UN, and expertise.

Selecting the Loya Jirga delegates 

In July 2003, a Presidential Decree outlined the process for delegate selection for the Constitutional Loya Jirga (CLJ), stating that there would be 500 delegates, 344 elected by caucus at the district level, 64 women elected by caucus at the provincial level, 42 delegates from refugee, nomad, and minority communities, and 50 people (25 men, 25 women) appointed by President Karzai. The delegates included activists such as Shukria Barakzai, who campaigns for women's rights.

Issues addressed 

Issues involving substantial debate included whether Afghanistan should have a presidential or parliamentary system, whether Dari or Pashto should be the official language, and whether other local languages would be recognized, whether former king Mohammed Zahir Shah should maintain the title "father of the nation," how to address women's rights, whether Afghanistan should be a free market economy, and whether higher education should be free.

The heaviest debate surrounded the question of the presidential vs. parliamentary system. Interim President Hamid Karzai supported a draft constitution the created a presidential system, which would provide one nationally elected figure who could effectively direct the executive branch. Others argued that for an ethnically diverse country coming out of years of conflict - a power-sharing model with a strong President presented the best hope for national unity and reconciliation. At one point President Karzai threatened that he would not run for the office in 2004 if a parliamentary system or semi-presidential system was created. Members of the Tajik-dominated Northern Alliance accused Karzai of buying off opponents with promises of influential positions in a post-election government. On January 1, the loya jirga broke down when close to half of the assembly, consisting mostly of Uzbek, Tajik, Hazara and Turkmen minorities, boycotted the only ballot, forcing chairman Sibghatullah Mojaddedi to call for a 2-day adjourning.

Following the highly restrictive regime of the Taliban, some rights including those related to entertainment were legalized again. However, liberals in the loya jirga were strongly challenged by conservatives, many of whom supported conservative policies such as the ban of music and dancing on public television.

Election of chairman, committees 

The Loya jirga was convened on 14 December, beneath a large tent at the newly refurbished technical university in Kabul. In the opening ceremonies, a dozen children in various traditional costumes waved Afghan flags and sang songs of peace, including "We are doves, waiting for peace, we are tired of fighting." Former king Mohammad Zahir Shah addressed the assembly. Then Mojaddedi was elected chairman, winning 252 votes, over Abdul Hafiz Mansoor's 154. Deputies were elected, but excluded women. Many of the 114 female delegates protested at not being represented in the secretariat. To assuage their concerns, Mojaddedi appointed Safia Sediqi to the fourth deputy position and two other women as deputies' assistants.

Members of constitutional commissions, supreme court and other government officials, and members of legal and human rights commissions were allowed to attend, but not vote. Provincial governors and top-ranking police, administration, and military officials were barred from the proceedings. Delegates were divided among ten committees to consider amendments to the draft constitution, which were submitted to a reconciliation council. Powerful militia leaders had been among the groups, often dominating the process.

On the third day, Malalai Joya , a female delegate from Farah Province, was temporarily evicted, having complained that the warlords would still be in charge of the new government. Her microphone was turned off when she suggested that some of the leaders should be tried in an international court. She remained under U.N. protection for several days because of death threats. Ms. Joya aroused controversy when she condemned the allocation of positions of influence at the council to certain faction leaders, including former president Burhanuddin Rabbani and Abdul Rasul Sayyaf, a deeply conservative Islamist.

Malalai Joya's historic speech 

On December 17, 2003, Malalai Joya, 25, from Farah Province delivered the following speech which received wide coverage in the media internationally:

"My name is Malalai Joya from Farah Province. By the permission of the esteemed attendees, and by the name of God and the colored-shroud martyrs of the path of freedom, I would like to speak for couple of minutes. 

My criticism on all my compatriots is that why are they allowing the legitimacy and legality of this Loya Jerga come under question with the presence of those felons who brought our country to this state. 

I feel pity and I feel very sorry that those who call Loya Jerga an infidel basis equivalent to blasphemy after coming here their words are accepted, or please see the committees and what people are whispering about. The chairman of every committee is already selected. Why do you not take all these criminals to one committee so that we see what they want for this nation. These were those who turned our country into the nucleus of national and international wars. They were the most anti-women people in the society who wanted to [makes pause] who brought our country to this state and they intend to do the same again. I believe that it is a mistake to test those already being tested. They should be taken to national and international court. If they are forgiven by our people, the bare- footed Afghan people, our history will never forgive them. They are all recorded in the history of our country."

Name controversy
Delegates collected more than the necessary 151 signatures calling for the word "Islamic" to be removed from the draft constitution, suggesting "Republic of Afghanistan" instead. Despite enough signatures, the jirga's chairman Sibghatullah Mojaddedi refused to hold a vote and publicly called the delegates "infidels", causing concern on freedom of speech.

Ratification 

After weeks of contentious debate, a walkout by the chair and hundreds of delegates, and dozens of amendments, the loya jirga ratified the constitution without taking a vote, but by consensus, on January 4, 2004. 

Many delegates complained that the process had no specific criteria, that the rules of procedure were not followed, and that delegates were not properly prepared or educated about the issues. There were also complaints that many of the most important decisions were made by militia and party leaders, Karzai's favorites, and international representatives, such as U.S. envoy Zalmay Khalilzad, behind the scenes.

A documentary film, "Hell of a Nation", produced and directed by Tamara Gould, Bonnie Cohen, and John Schenk, and aired on PBS's "Wide Angle" series covered the Afghan constitutional process in detail.

References

External links
 Afghans agree on new constitution - BBC News; 4 January 2004.
 Documentary on the Loya Jirga: "Hell of a Nation"
 RAWA remarks on the Loya Jirga

Loya jirga
Politics of Afghanistan
2003 in Kabul
Loya jirga
History of Afghanistan (1992–present)
December 2003 events in Asia